Anna Maria Kurska (24 August 1929 – 25 August 2016) was a Polish politician and lawyer. She was a member of Law and Justice party and a member of the Polish Senate from 2001 to 2007.

Early life 
On 24 August 1929, Kurska was born in Lviv, Poland (in modern-day Ukraine), to Tadeusz Modzelewski (of Polish Nobility origin) and Teodora Niemirowska (sister of Lewis Bernstein Namier). Teodora was born to Józef Bernstein aka Niemirowski and Anna Sommerstein, both of Jewish origin.

Education 
In 1955, Kurska earned law degree from  University of Warsaw.

Career 
Kurska started her career as a lawyer. In August 1980, Kurska became a judge in the Provincial Court of Gdansk. She was dismissed from her position in September 1981 as part of the introduction of martial law. In 1998 she regained her rights to practise law, and operated a law office in Tczew for two years, until she was re-nominated as a judge

Honours
In 2009, Kurska received the Commander's Cross of the Order of Polonia Restituta from Polish President Lech Kaczynski.

Personal life 
Kurska's children are Jacek Kurski, a politician, and Jarosław Kurski, a journalist.

References

1929 births
2016 deaths
Polish people of Jewish descent
Commanders of the Order of Polonia Restituta
Politicians from Lviv
Women members of the Senate of Poland
Warsaw Uprising insurgents
Members of the Senate of Poland 2001–2005
Members of the Senate of Poland 2005–2007
University of Warsaw alumni
Place of death missing
Lawyers from Lviv
20th-century Polish women
Women in World War II